Dufferin Mall is a shopping mall in Toronto, Ontario, Canada. It is located on the west side of Dufferin Street, south of the intersection of Bloor Street West, in the Brockton Village neighbourhood. It was first built as a shopping plaza in the 1950s on the site of the Dufferin Park Racetrack. It was later enclosed and made into a mall, in the 1970s.

Description
Dufferin Mall is a  district shopping centre. It has over 120 shops and services including big box stores and numerous clothing chains. The mall has a food court. The centre has a three-level parking lot.

Dufferin Mall attracts over 12 million visitors per year, making it one of the busiest malls per square foot in North America.

History
The location was a part of the Denison estate. In 1907, the site was leased to Abe Orpen who established the Dufferin Park Racetrack. The track operated from 1907 until 1955 when the track was sold to the Ontario Jockey Club and closed. The Ontario Jockey Club consolidated its locations and sold the site for development. The Dufferin Plaza Shopping Centre was a shopping plaza established in 1956. The shopping plaza opened in 1957 but was converted to an enclosed mall, opening as Dufferin Mall in 1973.

Past anchors include Horizon, a discount department store owned by T. Eaton Company. The space was converted to a regular Eaton's store upon the closure of the Horizon chain with the space being converted to a No Frills grocery store in the 1990s.

References

External links
Mall website
Primaris REIT
Mall mobile app demo

Shopping malls in Toronto
Shopping malls established in 1956
1956 establishments in Ontario